McDonald Avenue is a north-south street in Brooklyn, New York City. It runs underneath the New York City Subway's IND Culver Line for most of its length.

The B67 and B69 bus routes run on McDonald Avenue north of Cortelyou Road.

It passes near densely populated areas, cemeteries, and funeral homes, as well as a commercial corridor. In particular, the intersection with Bay Parkway is surrounded by cemeteries on three corners, including Washington Cemetery.

On March 14, 1933, the Board of Aldermen (today's City Council) passed a resolution changing the name of Gravesend Avenue to McDonald Avenue. This resolution received some opposition, as the Gravesend Chamber of Commerce believed that renaming Gravesend Avenue erased the historical connection to the town of Gravesend. The chamber further believed it was harmful to business.

References

Streets in Brooklyn